Esther Agbaje (born March 19, 1985) is an American politician serving in the Minnesota House of Representatives since 2021. A member of the Minnesota Democratic–Farmer–Labor Party (DFL), Agbaje represents District 59B, which includes portions of north and downtown Minneapolis in Hennepin County, Minnesota.

Early life, education, and career 

Agbaje was born in Saint Paul, Minnesota, to parents who immigrated to Minnesota from Nigeria. She grew up in Brainerd and Faribault, and graduated from Shattuck-St. Mary's Boarding School.

Agbaje graduated from George Washington University with a bachelor of arts in political science, the University of Pennsylvania with a master of public administration, and Harvard University with a juris doctor. As a law student, she worked at Harvard's Legal Aid Bureau and volunteered for Volunteer Lawyers Network Housing Court Project.

Agbaje worked at the United States Department of State as a Foreign Service Officer focusing on the Middle East. She is an associate attorney with Ciresi Conlin LLP, where she practices in general civil litigation and medical malpractice. She also did pro bono work helping renters dealing with housing insecurity and evictions.

Minnesota House of Representatives 

Agbaje was elected to the Minnesota House of Representatives in 2020 and reelected in 2022. She challenged four-term DFL incumbent Raymond Dehn, winning the DFL endorsement and defeating Dehn in the primary election.

Agbaje serves as vice chair of the Housing Finance and Policy Committee, and sits on the Elections Finance and Policy, Taxes, and Ways and Means Committees. She has served as an assistant majority leader since 2023. Agbaje co-chairs the House People of Color & Indigenous (POCI) Caucus and is vice chair of the Black Maternal Health Caucus.

The CROWN Act 
Agbaje authored the Creating a Respectful and Open World for Natural Hair (CROWN) Act. The legislation adds a definition of race that includes natural hairstyles and protects Minnesotans from discrimination based on their hairstyles. Agbaje testified about her experience straightening her hair for fear of losing a job or not being perceived as professional. The legislation passed the House floor in February 2022 but was not acted on by the Republican-controlled Minnesota Senate. In 2023 the bill passed both houses of the legislature and was signed by Governor Tim Walz.

Public safety and criminal justice reform 
Agbaje signed on to a letter by U.S. Representative Ilhan Omar asking the Department of Justice to expand its investigation into the Minneapolis Police Department following the murder of George Floyd. During the 2021 Minneapolis mayoral election, Agbaje did not endorse incumbent Jacob Frey, and signed on to a letter that advocated for a "new mayor" who would do more to end racial disparities and increase public safety. She supported voting "yes" on City Question 2, which would have renamed the Minneapolis Police Department the Minneapolis Department of Public Safety, removed minimum staffing levels for sworn officers, and shifted oversight of the new agency from the mayor’s office to the city council. Agbaje lives in the building where Minneapolis police shot and killed Amir Locke and has been a longtime supporter of police reform, including banning no-knock warrants.

Other political positions 
Agbaje has called for greater investment in housing, and has called housing a human right. She sponsored legislation that gave more rights and protections to those who use self-storage units, especially those who have recently been evicted. She joined environmental advocates in pushing for the closing of a metal shredder in North Minneapolis after a stockpile caught fire.

Electoral history

Personal life 
Agbaje lives in Minneapolis, Minnesota.

References

External links 

 Official House of Representatives website
 Official campaign website

1985 births
Living people
Columbian College of Arts and Sciences alumni
American people of Nigerian descent
American politicians of Nigerian descent
Fels Institute of Government alumni
Harvard Law School alumni
Democratic Party members of the Minnesota House of Representatives
21st-century American politicians
21st-century American women politicians
Minnesota lawyers
21st-century American women lawyers
21st-century American lawyers
African-American women lawyers
African-American lawyers
Women state legislators in Minnesota